Cochylis hollandana, Holland's cochylid moth, is a species of moth of the  family Tortricidae. It is found in North America, where it has been recorded from Connecticut, Indiana, Kentucky, Maine, Maryland, New Hampshire, North Carolina, Ohio, Oklahoma, Ontario, Pennsylvania, Quebec, Tennessee and Wisconsin.

The wingspan is 10–12 mm. Adults have been recorded on wing from March to September.

References

Moths described in 1907
Cochylis